The Squab Farm was a musical comedy about the film industry staged on Broadway in 1918. It was written by Fanny Hatton and Frederic Hatton, and staged at the Bijou Theatre on Broadway. It starred several former film directors as well as actress Alma Tell and a 16-year-old Tallulah Bankhead in her first stage role. She was reportedly chastised for whistling in the communal dressing room, unknowingly breaking one of the theater's oldest superstitions and fellow actress Julia Bruns took pity on her and invited to share her dressing room. George Foster Platt directed.

Helen Barnes also had a role in the show and  a New York Times reviewer wrote in a May 14, 1918 that Barnes appeared to be the audience's favorite squab. The play was a satire that compared a motion picture set to a barnyard. Barnes played the role of Hortense Hogan. The Squab Farm closed after a four-week run.

The show was presented by Lee Shubert and J. J. Shubert.

The Squab Farm featured in The Passing Show of 1918, a revue that included a young Fred Astaire as well as his sister Adele Astaire.

Plot
A movie director seeks an actress to fulfill his desires for a role as Eve.

Cast
The cast included:

Lowell Sherman as a film director
William L. Gibson as a business manager
Harry Davenport (actor) as an assistant director
Charles M. Seay as a film director
Fred Kaufman (actor) as a cameraman
Alfred Drayton as an office boy
Raymond Bloomer as a leading man
G. Oliver Smith as a juvenile
Julia Bruns as a leading woman
Bert Angeles as a cinematographer
Alma Tell as a young actress
Vivian Rushmore as a scenario writer
Ann Austin (actress) as a duchess

References

External links
 

1918 musicals
Musical comedy plays